Frank Marsh may refer to:

 Frank Lewis Marsh (1899–1992), American biologist, educator and creationist author
 Frank Marsh (footballer) (1916–1978), English footballer
 Frank Marsh (politician) (1924–2001), Nebraska politician
 Frank Marsh (nephrologist) (1936–2011), British nephrologist
 Frank Wayne Marsh (born 1940), former professional American football defensive back